"One for the Road" is a short story by Stephen King, first published in the March/April 1977 issue of Maine, and later collected in King's 1978 collection Night Shift.

Plot summary
The story is told by a man named Booth. Three years after the events of Salem's Lot, vampires still prowl the burned-out remains of Jerusalem’s Lot and its environs. Residents of nearby towns, including Booth, know this and live in unspoken fear, wearing religious symbols for protection and never venturing near the area. One night, Booth and his friend, bar owner Herb "Tookey" Tooklander, attempt to rescue the wife and daughter of a motorist named Gerard Lumley, whose vehicle is stranded in a ferocious blizzard. Initially contemptuous of Lumley for driving in such weather, both are horrified upon realizing that his vehicle is stranded in Jerusalem's Lot. They reluctantly drive out in an International Scout with Lumley to try to save his wife and daughter, fearing the worst.

The three locate Lumley's Mercedes still running and heated but nonetheless abandoned. The two men, realizing what has likely happened to Lumley's family, try to get him to leave with them, but Lumley refuses and stumbles around in the snow, calling for his wife and daughter. Lumley's wife emerges from the dark and Lumley hurries toward her; he notices her fanged teeth and red eyes too late and is bitten. Booth nearly falls victim to Lumley's daughter, but Tookey throws a Douay Bible at her as both men scramble into the Scout, quickly fleeing the area.

Booth concludes by saying Tookey died of a heart attack a couple of years after the incident. He mentions that he has nightmares about that night and about Lumley’s daughter, and warns the reader that if they are in the area, to never go up the road into Jerusalem's Lot for any reason, especially at night, lest the reader encounters Lumley’s daughter, the little girl who is "still waiting for her goodnight kiss".

Connection to King's other works
This story acts as a sequel to King's 1975 novel 'Salem's Lot, and is also connected to the story of "Jerusalem's Lot", which is a prequel to both, while also appearing in Night Shift. Both stories were later collected in the 2005 Salem's Lot Illustrated Edition.

See also
 Stephen King short fiction bibliography

References

External links 

'Salem's Lot
Short stories by Stephen King
1978 short stories
Horror short stories
Maine in fiction
Vampires in written fiction
Works originally published in American magazines
Works originally published in lifestyle magazines